The Tribes of Arabia or Arab tribes are the ethnic Arab tribes and clans that originated in the Arabian Peninsula. The tribes of Arabia descend from either one of the two Arab ancestors, Adnan or Qahtan. Arab tribes have historically inhabited the Arabian Peninsula, but after the spread of Islam, they began to heavily migrate and settle in other areas such as the Levant, Mesopotamia, Egypt, Sudan, the Maghreb, and Khuzestan. Today, all these areas are located in the Arab world with the exception of Khuzestan. These Arab tribes have played a role in the demographic changes in the Arab world through the increase of the Arab population, as well as the ethnic, cultural, linguistic, and genetic Arabization of the Levant and North Africa.

Arab genealogical tradition 
The general consensus among 14th-century Arab genealogists is that Arabs are of three kinds:

 Al-Arab al-Ba'ida, "The Extinct Arabs", were an ancient group of tribes of prehistory that included the ‘Ād, the Thamud, the Tasm, the Jadis, the Imlaq (who included branches of Banu al-Samayda), and others. The Jadis and the Tasm are said to have been exterminated by genocide. The Qur'an records that disappearance of the 'Ad and Thamud came of their decadence. Recent archaeological excavations have uncovered inscriptions which reference 'Iram, once a major city of the 'Aad.
 Al-Arab al-Ariba, "The Pure Arabs", came from saudi Qahtanite Arabs.
 Al-Arab al-Mustarabah, “The Arabized Arabs”, also known as the Adnanite Arabs, were the progeny of Ismail, the firstborn son of the patriarch Abraham.

The Hawazin tribe and the Quraysh tribe are considered ‘Adnani Arabs. Much of the lineage provided before Ma'ad relies on biblical genealogy, so questions persist concerning the accuracy of this segment of Adnanite Arab genealogy. Adnanites are believed to be the descendants of Ishmael through Adnan but the traditional Adnanite lineage doesn't match the biblical line exactly. According to Arab tradition, the Adnanites are called Arabised because it is believed that Ishmael Spoke Aramaic and Egyptian then learnt Arabic from a Qahtanite Yemeni woman that he married. Therefore, the Adnanites are descendants of Abraham. Modern historiography "unveiled the lack of inner coherence of this genealogical system and demonstrated that it finds insufficient matching evidence".

History

Early history 
The tribes of Arabia engaged in nomadic herding and agriculture since 6000 BCE. By about 850 BCE, a complex network of settlements and camps was established. The earliest Arab tribes emerged from Bedouins. A major source of income for these people was the taxation of caravans, and tributes collected from non-Bedouin settlements. They also earned income by transporting goods and people in caravans pulled by domesticated camels across the desert. Scarcity of water and of permanent pastoral land required them to move constantly.

The Nabataeans were nomadic Arabs who moved into territory vacated by the Edomites – Semites who settled the region centuries before them. Their early inscriptions were in Aramaic, but gradually switched to Arabic, and since they had writing, it was they who made the first inscriptions in Arabic. The Nabataean alphabet was adopted by Arabs to the south, and evolved into modern Arabic script around the 4th century. This is attested by Safaitic inscriptions (beginning in the 1st century BCE) and the many Arabic personal names in Nabataean inscriptions. From about the 2nd century BCE, a few inscriptions from Qaryat al-Faw reveal a dialect no longer considered proto-Arabic, but pre-classical Arabic. Five Syriac inscriptions mentioning Arabs have been found at Sumatar Harabesi, one of which dates to the 2nd century CE.

The Ghassanids, Lakhmids and Kindites were the last major migration of pre-Islamic Arabs out of Yemen to the north. The Ghassanids increased the Semitic presence in the then Hellenized Syria, the majority of Semites were Aramaic peoples. They mainly settled in the Hauran region and spread to modern Lebanon, Palestine and Jordan.

Migration to Egypt 

Prior to the Muslim conquest of Egypt, Egypt was under Greek and Roman influence. Under the Umayyad Caliphate, Arabic became the official language in Egypt rather than Coptic or Greek. The caliphate also allowed the migration of Arab tribes to Egypt. The Muslim governor of Egypt encouraged the migration of tribes from the Arabian Peninsula to Egypt to increase the Muslim population in the region and to strengthen his regime by enlisting warrior tribesmen to his forces, encouraging them to bring their families and entire clans. The Fatimid era was the peak of Bedouin Arab tribal migrations to Egypt.

Migration to the Levant 
On the eve of the Rashidun Caliphate's conquest of the Levant, 634 AD, Syria's population mainly spoke Aramaic; Greek was the official language of administration. Arabization and Islamization of Syria began in the 7th century, and it took several centuries for Islam, the Arab identity, and language to spread; the Arabs of the caliphate did not attempt to spread their language or religion in the early periods of the conquest, and formed an isolated aristocracy. The Arabs of the caliphate accommodated many new tribes in isolated areas to avoid conflict with the locals; caliph Uthman ordered his governor, Muawiyah I, to settle the new tribes away from the original population. Syrians who belonged to Monophysitic denominations welcomed the peninsular Arabs as liberators.

Migration to the Maghreb 
The first wave of Arab immigration to the Maghreb began with the conquest of the Maghreb in the seventh century, with the migration of sedentary and nomadic Arabs to the Maghreb from the Arabian Peninsula. Arab tribes such as Banu Muzaina migrated, and the Arab Muslims in the region had more impact on the culture of the Maghreb than the region's conquerors before and after them. The major migration to the region by Arab tribes was in the 11th century when the tribes of Banu Hilal and Banu Sulaym, along with others, were sent by the Fatimids to defeat a Berber rebellion and then settle in the Maghreb. These tribes advanced in large numbers all the way to Morocco, contributing to a more extensive ethnic, genetic, cultural, and linguistic Arabization in the region. The Arab tribes of Maqil migrated to the Maghreb a century later and even immigrated southwards to Mauritania. Beni Hassan defeated both Berbers and Black Africans in the region, pushing them southwards to the Senegal river while the Arab tribes settled in Mauritania. The Arab descendants of the original Arabian settlers who continue to speak Arabic as a first language currently form the single largest population group in North Africa.

Migration to Mesopotamia 
The migration of Arab tribes to Mesopotamia began in the seventh century, and by the late 20th century constituted about three quarters of the population of Iraq. A large Arab migration to Mesopotamia followed the Muslim conquest of Mesopotamia in 634, which saw an increase in the culture and ideals of the Bedouins in the region. The second Arab tribal migration to northern Mesopotamia was in the 10th century when the Banu Numayr migrated there.

Migration to Sudan 
In the 12th century, the Arab Ja'alin tribe migrated into Nubia and Sudan and formerly occupied the country on both banks of the Nile from Khartoum to Abu Hamad. They trace their lineage to Abbas, uncle of the Islamic prophet Muhammad. They are of Arab origin, but now of mixed blood mostly with Nilo-Saharans and Nubians. Other Arab tribes migrated into Sudan in the 12th century and intermarried with the indigenous populations, forming the Sudanese Arabs. In 1846, many Arab Rashaida migrated from Hejaz in present-day Saudi Arabia into what is now Eritrea and north-east Sudan after tribal warfare had broken out in their homeland. The Rashaida of Sudan and Eritrea live in close proximity with the Beja people. Large numbers of Bani Rasheed are also found on the Arabian Peninsula. They are related to the Banu Abs tribe.

Migration to Iran
After the Arab conquest of Persia in the 7th century, many Arab tribes settled in different parts of Iran, notably Khurasan and Ahwaz, it is the Arab tribes of Khuzestan that have retained their identity in language and culture to the present day while other Arabs especially in Khurasan were slowly Persianised. Khurusani Arabs were mainly contingent from Nejdi tribes such as Banu Tamim.

There was a great influx of Arab tribes into Khuzestan from the 16th to the 19th century, including the migration of the Banu Ka'b and Banu Lam from the Arabian desert. Tribalism is a significant characteristic of Arab population in Khuzestan.

Other later Arab migrations in Iran include the mostly cross Gulf migrations of Arabs into Hormozgan and Fars provinces from modern day eastern Saudi Arabia and other Gulf States, post 16th century. These include Sunni Huwala and Achomi people, who compromise of both fully Arab and mixed Arab-Persian families. The Arabs on the Iranian side of the Gulf tend to speak a dialect much closer to Gulf Arabic opposed to the Khuzestani Arabic which is closer to Iraqi Arabic.

The Great Skulls of Arabia 
According to Arab traditions, tribes are divided into different divisions called Arab skulls (جماجم العرب), which is a term given to a group of tribes of the Arabian Peninsula, which are described in the traditional custom of strength, abundance, victory, and honor. A number of them branched out, which later became independent tribes (sub-tribes). They are called "Skulls" because it is thought that the skull is the most important part of the body, and the majority of Arab tribes are descended from these major tribes.

They are:
Bakr, has descendants in Arabia and Iraq.
Kinanah, has descendants in Arabia, Iraq, Egypt, Sudan, Palestine, Tunisia, Morocco, and Syria.
Hawazin, has descendants in Arabia, Libya, Algeria, Morocco, Sudan, and Iraq.
Tamim, has descendants in Arabia, Iraq, Iran, Palestine, Algeria, and Morocco
Azd, has descendants in Arabia, Iraq, Levant, and North Africa.
Ghatafan, has descendants in Arabia and the Maghreb.
Madhhij, has descendants in Arabia and Iraq.
Abd al-Qays, has descendants in Arabia. 
Al Qays (القيس), has descendants in Arabia.
Quda'a, has descendants in Arabia, Syria, and North Africa.

See also
Iranian Arabs
Arab tribes in Iraq

References

External links
 The dwelling places and wanderings of the Arabian tribes, by Heinrich Ferdinand Wüstenfeld, in German

Tribes of Arabia
Arabs
Arab groups